Ira Allison Belden  (April 16, 1874 – July 15, 1916) was an American outfielder in Major League Baseball who played in the late 19th century.

External links

1874 births
1916 deaths
Major League Baseball outfielders
Baseball players from Cleveland
Cleveland Spiders players
19th-century baseball players
Oil City Oilers players
Burlington Colts players
Fort Wayne Indians players
Minneapolis Millers (baseball) players
St. Joseph Saints players
Denver Grizzlies (baseball) players
Pueblo Indians players
Wichita Jobbers players
Des Moines Boosters players